Busan International Finance Center·Busan Bank Station is a station on the Busan Metro Line 2 in Munhyeon-dong, Nam District, Busan, South Korea. As its name suggests, Busan International Finance Center is located right next to the station. Prior to November 4, 2014, the station was named "Munjeon Station."

References

External links

  Cyber station information from Busan Transportation Corporation

Busan Metro stations
Nam District, Busan
Railway stations opened in 2001